Norleucine (abbreviated as Nle) is an amino acid with the formula CH3(CH2)3CH(NH2)CO2H.  A systematic name for this compound is 2-aminohexanoic acid.  The compound is an isomer of the more common amino acid leucine. Like most other α-amino acids, norleucine is chiral. It is a white, water-soluble solid.

Occurrence
Together with norvaline, norleucine is found in small amounts in some bacterial strains where its concentration can approach millimolar.  Its biosynthesis has been examined. It arises via the action of 2-isopropylmalate synthase on α-ketobutyrate. The incorporation of Nle into peptides reflects the imperfect selectivity of the associated aminoacyl-tRNA synthetase.  In Miller–Urey experiments probing prebiotic synthesis of amino acids, norleucine and especially norvaline are formed.

Uses
It is nearly isosteric with methionine, even though it does not contain sulfur. For this reason, norleucine has been used to probe the role of methionine in Amyloid-β peptide (AβP) the central constituent of senile plaques in Alzheimer's disease. A study showed that with the substitution of the methionine at the 35 position with norleucine the neurotoxic effects of the Aβ peptides were completely negated.

See also 
 Leucines, description of the isomers of leucine
 norvaline, isomer of valine that has similar biochemistry to that of norleucine.

References

Non-proteinogenic amino acids